MS  Aallotar, a ship who frequently bore name MS Rogalin

Rogalin may also refer to the following places in Poland:
 Rogalin, a village and landscape park near Poznań
Rogalin, Radziejów County in Kuyavian-Pomeranian Voivodeship (north-central Poland)
Rogalin, Sępólno County in Kuyavian-Pomeranian Voivodeship (north-central Poland)
Rogalin, Lublin Voivodeship (east Poland)